The Tupiza River is a seasonal river located in Bolivia in the Potosí Department, in the Sud Chichas Province. The Tupiza River is a mainly seasonal river; it dries up during the dry season, and becomes full in the wet season. It flows for 28 miles southeast, towards Paraguay, before ending west of Tarija.

River

Path 
The river forms at an altitude of 3327 meters at the confluence of the Río Chilco and the Río Tres Palcas. The river flows west for the first 20 kilometers, then turns south, crosses the city of Tupiza and flows into the Río San Juan del Oro, a tributary of the Río Pilcomayo, at an altitude of 2874m. It is not navigable.

It has two tributaries that flow into it near Tupiza, the Tatasi River and the Alexandrabetha River. Both join it on the westward side. 

The river is used for irrigation for the nearby villages, with canals feeding plots of corn, potatoes, and onions.

Ending 
The Tupiza river valley ends in a canyon now called "El Angosto", which is 120 meters long, 6 meters high and 5 meters wide. There are two tunnels, one for vehicles and another for rail, as well as a viewpoint overlooking the confluence of the San Juan Oro and Tupiza rivers.

Flooding 
In 2018, record rainfall in the area caused the river to overflow its banks and flood the local village. Much of the Tupiza watershed was ruined, with damage to buildings, livestock, and farms.

Area Climate

See also 
 Tatasi River
 List of rivers of Bolivia

References
Rivers of Potosí Department